Richard Orlinski (born 1966  in Paris) is a French sculptor and visual neo-pop artist.

Born in Paris in 1966, Richard Orlinski started his artistic career in the early 2000s.

He also produces music, premiering  Heartbeat featuring Dutch pop singer Eva Simons in 2016 in Cannes.

Exhibitions

In December 2019, he exhibited sculptures from his "Born Wild" collection at the Markowicz Fine Art, an American contemporary art gallery.

References

External links

1966 births
Living people